Barry Mather (20 February 1909 – 30 March 1982) was a Canadian journalist, columnist, and politician.

Born in Condor, Alberta, he was a journalist for the Vancouver News Herald and a columnist with The Vancouver Sun before being elected to the House of Commons of Canada in the 1962 federal election for the British Columbia riding of New Westminster. A member of the New Democratic Party, he was re-elected in the 1963, 1965, 1968, and 1972 elections in the ridings of New Westminster, Surrey, and Surrey—White Rock.

In 1965, he was the first Member of Parliament to introduce a freedom of information bill as a private member's bill. Although it didn't pass, he would re-introduce the same legislation in every parliamentary session between 1968 and 1974. In 1983, an Access to Information Act would finally be passed. Mather was also one of the first parliamentarians to call for restrictions on the sale of cigarettes; in 1969, he called for a ban on all cigarette advertising.

He was the co-author of the 1958 book, New Westminster, The Royal City. He was married to Camille Mather, a former Co-operative Commonwealth Federation member of the Legislative Assembly of British Columbia in the riding of Delta. They had two daughters: Mary and Jane.

He died of a heart attack during a vacation in Nerja in 1982.

References

External links
 

1909 births
1982 deaths
Members of the House of Commons of Canada from British Columbia
New Democratic Party MPs